Beatty–Trimpe Farm, also known as the Beatty–Kasting–Trimpe Farm, is a historic home and farm located in Hamilton Township, Jackson County, Indiana.  The farmhouse was built about 1874, and is a two-story, brick Italianate style I-house with a one-story rear ell. A one-story addition was constructed in 1970.  Also on the property are the contributing smokehouse (c. 1874), ice house, scale shed (c. 1910), round roof barn (c. 1949), granary / corn crib (c. 1949), garage / workshop (c. 1949), and English barn (1850s).

It was listed on the National Register of Historic Places in 2003.

References

Farms on the National Register of Historic Places in Indiana
Italianate architecture in Indiana
Houses completed in 1874
Buildings and structures in Jackson County, Indiana
National Register of Historic Places in Jackson County, Indiana